Air Europa was founded by the International Leisure Group (ILG) as charter airline in . Based in Palma de Mallorca, private Spanish investors made up 75% of the stock, while the remaining 25% was held by ILG. In 1993, Air Europa became the first privately owned Spanish carrier in operating domestic scheduled services; international scheduled services started in 1995. By , the airline operated international scheduled services to Havana, London, Milan, New York City, Paris, Porto, Puerto Plata, Punta Cana and Santo Domingo; the list of domestic destinations comprised Alicante, Asturias, Badajoz, Barcelona, Bilbao, Granada, Ibiza, Jerez de la Frontera, La Coruna, Lanzarote, Las Palmas, Madrid, Málaga, Menorca, Palma de Mallorca, Salamanca, Santiago de Compostela, Seville, Tenerife, Valencia, Valladolid and Zaragoza.

List

Air Europa serves the following destinations, :

References

External links
 

Lists of airline destinations
SkyTeam destinations